Raspberry Field (Hangul: 라즈베리필드) is a South Korean indie duo formed in 2007. The duo debuted in the year 2010 with a single entitled Saturday Afternoon (토요일 오후에). The group consists of Soy (Vocals & Guitar) and Jang Jun Seon (Guitar).

History
Soy was previously a member of the girl group T.T.Ma before she formed an indie duo along with Jang Jun Seon. The acoustic version of the song Wanna Be Loved was originally from T.T.Ma and was included as a bonus track on Raspberry Field's first single.

Raspberry Field initially appeared in various clubs in the Hong Ik University area and other various music festivals, particularly in the Pentaport Concert. The name of the duo was created because of their music that was compared to a raspberry. According to Soy, their songs are about the double-sidedness of life, as it offers both sweet and bitter moments.

Their single Saturday Afternoon was featured in the commercial of Etude, a cosmetic brand in South Korea. The lyrics and music of the song was composed by Soy herself.

Although all their singles were done through Cho Ah Entertainment, their latest album was produced through Macaroon Company and distributed in the United States by Kingpin Entertainment

Members

Soy
Soy (born Kim So Yeon (김소연) on 1980 November 24) debuted in 1999 as a member of the group T.T.Ma. She has an older sister who go with the stage name Hey (해이). She is a graduate of Korea University. She has also acted in various films and dramas since 2004 before debuting as a member of Raspberry Field in 2010. She is in charge of the vocals and occasionally on guitar.

Jang Jun Seon
Jang Jun Seon (장준선) was born on July 22, 1980. He is in charge of the guitar.

Discography

Singles

Albums

References

External links
Raspberry Field Official site
Raspberry Field – Music Daum

Musical groups established in 2007
Musical groups from Seoul
South Korean indie rock groups